Düsseldorf-Hellerhof is a railway station situated at Hellerhof, Düsseldorf in western Germany. It is classified by Deutsche Bahn as a category 5 station. It is served by the S6 line of the Rhine-Ruhr S-Bahn at 20-minute intervals.

References

Railway stations in Düsseldorf
Railway stations in Germany opened in 1982
Rhine-Ruhr S-Bahn stations
S6 (Rhine-Ruhr S-Bahn)
S68 (Rhine-Ruhr S-Bahn)
1982 establishments in West Germany

de:Hellerhof (Düsseldorf)#S-Bahn-Haltepunkt